CJSF may refer to:

CJSF-FM, a radio station at Simon Fraser University in Burnaby, British Columbia
California Junior Scholarship Federation, a subdivision of the California Scholarship Federation